Santiago is a Colombian municipality located in Norte de Santander Department.

References
  Government of Norte de Santander - Santiago
  Santiago official website

Municipalities of the Norte de Santander Department